Norazlan bin Razali (born 19 December 1985) is a Malaysian football player who  plays for Malaysia Super League side Melaka United as a goalkeeper.

Club career

Johor, Kuala Lumpur
Norazlan began his career with home town team Johor before moving to Kuala Lumpur in 2010, making 52 appearances and earning a national team call up. He made three appearances against Iraq, Saudi Arabia and Palestine but none of the match listed as FIFA 'A' international match.

Selangor
In 2015, Norazlan returned to Selangor.

Felda United 
In the 2019 season, Norazlan was transferred to Felda United under the wings of Mohd Nidzam Jamil.

Statistics

Club

1 Includes Malaysia FA Cup matches.
2 Includes Malaysia Cup matches.
3 Includes AFC Cup matches.

Honours

Club honours
Johor Darul Takzim
 2014 Malaysia Super League
Selangor Fa
2015 Malaysia Cup

References

Malaysian footballers
Living people
1985 births
Selangor FA players
People from Johor
Malaysian people of Malay descent
Association football goalkeepers